The table below lists the Armenian schools in the United States.

 *Saint Stephen's Armenian Elementary School operated as a PreK-8 up until the early 2000s.
 **The Mekhitarist Fathers' Armenian School operated as a PreK-8 up until 2011.
 ***Sahag Mesrob Armenian Christian School operated as a PreK-12 up until 2011.
 ****AGBU Vatche & Tamar High School announced that it will cease to operate after the 2019-2020 school year. 

The table below lists the closed Armenian schools in the United States.

See also
Armenian American

References

External links
 Western Prelacy Schools
 AGBU Schools
 Armenian Catholic Schools
 ARS Western Saturday Schools
 Eastern Prelacy
 Eastern Diocese

Armenian language
Armenian
Armenian-American culture
Armenian